The Diocese of Artsakh is one of the largest dioceses of the Armenian Apostolic Church covering the self-proclaimed Republic of Artsakh. It is named after the historic province of Artsakh; the 10th province of the Kingdom of Armenia. The diocesan headquarters are located on Ghazanchetots street 72, in the town of Shushi. The seat of the bishop is the Ghazanchetsots Cathedral. On 21 January 2022, Vrtanes Abrahamyan was appointed Primate of the Diocese.

History

The diocese was established in 1989. Since its creation, archbishop Pargev Martirosyan (Պարգև արքեպիսկոպոս Մարտիրոսյան) has served as its primate.

All churches in Nagorno-Karabakh were closed in the 1930s by the Soviet government. The totalitarian regime was relatively relaxed by Mikhail Gorbachev. A mass movement for the unification of Nagorno-Karabakh with Armenia started in February 1988.  With Armenian national identity in rise in the Soviet Union, the Diocese of Artsakh was established in 1989. The 13th century Gandzasar monastery was the first one to be reopened. It remains the historic center of the Diocese of Artsakh, while the Ghazanchetsots Cathedral is the administrative center of the diocese.

The construction of the Holy Mother of God Cathedral in Stepanakert was launched on July 19, 2006. The cost of the project is around US$2 million and the architect of the church is Gagik Yeranosyan. However, the construction process was slow due to the lack of financial resources. Upon its consecration, it will become the seat of the Diocese of Artsakh.

Active churches

Here is the list of churches, monasteries and chapels functioning under the jurisdiction of the Diocese of Artsakh, along with their location and year of consecration:

Churches

 Vankasar Church, near Martakert, 7th century
 Holy Resurrection Church, Hadrut, 1621
 Saint John the Baptist Church (Kanach Zham), Shusha, 1818
 Saint John the Baptist Church, Martakert, 1881
 Ghazanchetsots Holy Savior Cathedral, Shusha, 1888
 Church of the Holy Ascension, Lachin, 1998
 Church of the Holy Martyrs, Zabux, 2002
 Church of the Holy Mother of God, Askeran, 2002
 Church of St. Nerses the Great, Martuni, 2004
 Surp Sarkis Church, Qızılqaya, 2005
 Surp Sarkis Church, Yeghtsahogh, 2006
 Saint James' Church, Stepanakert, 2007
 Saint Anthony Church, Zəylik, 2009
 Saint George's Church, Mets Shen, 2011
 Church of the Holy Mother of God, Vaghuhas, 2012
 Saint George's Church, Aşağı Oratağ, 2012
 Saint John the Baptist Church, Daşbaşı, 2013

Monasteries
 Amaras Monastery, Sos, 4th century
 Tsitsernavank Monastery, Tsitsernavank, 5-6th centuries
 Gandzasar monastery, Vank, 10-13th centuries

Inactive/ruined churches and monasteries

This is an incomplete list of inactive or ruined churches and monasteries in the territory regulated by the Diocese of Artsakh:
 Katarovank Monastery, Hadrut Region, 4th century
 Yeghishe Arakyal Monastery, Martakert Region, 5th century
 Dadivank Monastery, Shahumyan Region, 9-13th centuries
 Gtichavank Monastery, Togh, 1248
 Monastery of Tsar, Tsar, 1301
 Yerits Mankants Monastery, Martakert Region, 1691

Gallery

External links
 Churches of Artsakh after independence

References

Armenian Apostolic Church in the Republic of Artsakh
Artsakh
Artsakh
Artsakh
Religious organisations based in the Republic of Artsakh